The Deer Park–West Werribee railway line is a  non-electrified rail line on the western fringes of the metropolitan area of Melbourne, Victoria. The line carries the Geelong-Melbourne rail service operated by the state regional rail provider V/Line. The line also provides commuter service for the suburban stations of Tarneit and Wyndham Vale. 

It was constructed as part of the Regional Rail Link project between June 2012 and October 2014 and opened on 21 June 2015, which separated most western V/Line regional services from metropolitan trains. The railway line will eventually become part of the metropolitan network under the Western Rail Plan, announced by the Andrews government in 2018.

History

The Deer Park–West Werribee railway line was built as part of the Regional Rail Link project that aimed to increase rail capacity by segregating regional and suburban passenger services in Melbourne. The line runs from three kilometres west of Deer Park railway station, on the Serviceton line, to Manor junction on the Warrnambool line. The double-track line includes new stations at Tarneit and Wyndham Vale. Geelong-Melbourne rail services run via the new route and so no longer have to share tracks with Werribee line services run by Metro Trains. However, trains on the route effectively provide a suburban service for Wyndham Vale and Tarneit residents. 

Test trains began operating upon completion of the line in October 2014 and passenger services started on 21 June 2015.

Future expansion 
In 2018 the Andrews government announced a long-term plan to electrify the corridor.

In 2022, during the 2022 Victorian state election, the Andrews government committed to building two new infill stations on the corridor at Tarneit West and Truganina. The stations are to be built prior to electrification.

References

Railway lines in Melbourne
Railway lines opened in 2015
5 ft 3 in gauge railways in Australia
2015 establishments in Australia
Transport in the City of Melton
Transport in the City of Wyndham